Mount Qelqëz ( or Mali i Qelqëzëz)  is a mountain in north-east Gjirokastër County, near Frashër, Albania. It is encompassed in the Fir of Hotovë-Dangelli National Park.

The mountain is located near the border with Korçë County, some 35 km southwest of Korçë. The village Qinam-Radovickë is placed on the north-east slope of the mountain. The southern and western slopes of the mountain are among the largest areas of the oak belt in Albania.

Mount Qelqëz defines the historical north-eastern limit of the geographic region of Epirus proper.

References

Bibliography

Geography of Gjirokastër County
Mountains of Albania